The 1999 Supertaça Cândido de Oliveira was the 21st edition of the Supertaça Cândido de Oliveira, the annual Portuguese football season-opening match contested by the winners of the previous season's top league and cup competitions (or cup runner-up in case the league- and cup-winning club is the same). The 1999 Supertaça Cândido de Oliveira was contested over two legs, and opposed Porto of the Primeira Liga and Beira-Mar of the Liga de Honra. Porto qualified for the SuperCup by winning the 1998–99 Primeira Divisão, whilst Beira-Mar qualified for their first Supertaça by winning the 1998–99 Taça de Portugal.

The first leg was televised on RTP, whilst the second leg was televised on TVI. The first leg which took place at the Estádio Mário Duarte, saw Porto defeat the Auri-negros 2–1 thanks to late strike from Esquerdinha. The second leg which took place at the Estádio das Antas, saw the Dragões defeat the Aveiro side and thus claim an eleventh Supertaça.

First leg

Details

Second leg

Details

References

Supertaça Cândido de Oliveira
1999–2000 in Portuguese football
FC Porto matches
S.C. Beira-Mar matches
August 1999 sports events in Europe